Gao Pan (born 22 May 1995) is a Chinese taekwondo practitioner. She is a gold medalist at the Asian Indoor and Martial Arts Games and Asian Taekwondo Championships and a bronze medalist at the Asian Games.

In 2017, she competed in the women's middleweight event at the 2017 World Taekwondo Championships held in Muju, South Korea without winning a medal. She won her first match against Kirstie Alora of the Philippines and she was eliminated from the competition in her next match, against Petra Matijašević. A few months later, she won the gold medal in the women's −67 kg event at the 2017 Asian Indoor and Martial Arts Games held in Ashgabat, Turkmenistan.

In 2018, she won one of the bronze medals in the women's +67 kg event at the 2018 Asian Games held in Jakarta, Indonesia. In the semi-finals, she was eliminated by the eventual gold medalist Lee Da-bin of South Korea.

References

External links 
 

Living people
1995 births
Place of birth missing (living people)
Chinese female taekwondo practitioners
Taekwondo practitioners at the 2018 Asian Games
Medalists at the 2018 Asian Games
Asian Games bronze medalists for China
Asian Games medalists in taekwondo
Asian Taekwondo Championships medalists
21st-century Chinese women